Delaware Township is a township in Jefferson County, Kansas, USA.  As of the 2000 census, its population was 2,034.

Geography
Delaware Township covers an area of 88.54 square miles (229.31 square kilometers); of this, 0.1 square miles (0.25 square kilometers) or 0.11 percent is water. The streams of Brush Creek, Cedar Creek, Coal Creek, Johannes Branch, North Cedar Creek, North Walnut Creek, Peter Creek, Rock Creek, South Cedar Creek and Walnut Creek run through this township.

Cities and towns
 Valley Falls

Unincorporated towns
 Half Mound
(This list is based on USGS data and may include former settlements.)

Adjacent townships
 Kapioma Township, Atchison County (north)
 Benton Township, Atchison County (northeast)
 Jefferson Township (east)
 Norton Township (east)
 Ozawkie Township (southeast)
 Douglas Township, Jackson County (southwest)
 Rock Creek Township (southwest)
 Cedar Township, Jackson County (west)
 Garfield Township, Jackson County (northwest)

Cemeteries
The township contains four cemeteries: Farrar, Graggs Chapel, Rose Hill and Saint Marys.

Major highways
 K-4
 K-16
 K-4, 16

References
 U.S. Board on Geographic Names (GNIS)
 United States Census Bureau cartographic boundary files

External links
 US-Counties.com
 City-Data.com

Townships in Jefferson County, Kansas
Townships in Kansas